Fred Edward Weary Jr. (born September 30, 1977) is a former American football guard. He was drafted by the Houston Texans in the third round of the 2002 NFL Draft. He played college football at Tennessee.

Professional career

Houston Texans
He was drafted in the 2002 NFL Draft by the Texans and started 12 of the 16 games he played in as a rookie.

He suffered a broken leg on December 2, 2007 in a game against the Tennessee Titans. In the 2008 preseason, he was placed on season-ending injured reserve. The Texans released him on October 14.

Cleveland Browns
Weary was signed by the Cleveland Browns on August 9, 2009. Within a few short weeks the Browns released him with an undisclosed injury settlement.

References

External links
Cleveland Browns bio

1977 births
Living people
American football centers
American football offensive guards
American football offensive tackles
Cleveland Browns players
Houston Texans players
Players of American football from Montgomery, Alabama
Tennessee Volunteers football players